Radio Naya Jiwan is a listener supported, only Hindi language Christian, radio station in Fiji. The station broadcasts on the 94.6Mhz to the cities of Suva, Navua, Pacific Harbour, Lami, Nasinu, Nakasi and Nausori. The station also broadcasts online, and on smartphones through Listen2myradio Radio Mobile App as "Nayajiwan".

The annual fund-raising to operate the stations are done in February and September.

The station is operated by Evangelical Bible Mission Trust Board the organisation which also operates Radio Light  in Fiji.
Radio Naya Jiwan was launched on 1 October 2004, with the mission to carry the message of The Christ to the Hindi and Urdu listeners in Fiji.

"Naya Jiwan" is translated into English as "New Life".

References

Hindi-language radio stations
Radio stations in Fiji
Hindi Christian Radio
Christian Radio in Fiji
Christian radio
Hindi Radio in Fiji